Runji Gautampura is a town and a nagar panchayat in Indore district in the Indian state of Madhya Pradesh. Gautampura was built by the holkar state queen Rani Gautama Bai.

Demographics
 India census, Runji Gautampura had a population of 13,221. Males constitute 51% of the population and females 49%. Runji Gautampura has an average literacy rate of 58%, lower than the national average of 59.5%. The male literacy is 69%, and female literacy is 46%. In Runji Gautampura, 16% of the population is under 6 years of age.

References

Cities and towns in Indore district